The Noidoro River is a river of Mato Grosso state in western Brazil, a tributary of the Rio das Mortes. It is also known as the Rio Francisco Horta Barbosa.

See also
List of rivers of Mato Grosso

References
Brazilian Ministry of Transport

Rivers of Mato Grosso